Matsonia may refer to one of these ships operated by the Matson Navigation Company:

 , served as USS Matsonia (ID-1589) during World War I; sold to the Alaska Packers Association and renamed Etolin; served as United States Army troopship USAT Etolin during World War II; placed in reserve fleet in 1946, scrapped in 1957.
 , originally named Malolo, was renamed Matsonia in 1937; served as War Shipping Administration troopship during World War II; later sold to Home Lines and operated as Atlantic and, later, Queen Frederica; damaged by fire in 1978, she was scrapped three years later.
 SS Matsonia (1931), originally named Monterey, then renamed in 1957, before being sold and becoming Lurline and then Britanis for Chandris Lines, operating as a cruise ship for the until 2000, when she was sold for scrap and sank on her way to Indian ship breakers.
 , steam turbine roll-on/roll-off ship, later converted to ro/ro-containership; still in service as at September 2018.
 A new ro/ro-containership Matsonia was ordered in 2016 for delivery in 2019/2020.

References 

Ship names